Dave may refer to:

Arts and entertainment
 Dave (film), a 1993 film starring Kevin Kline and Sigourney Weaver
 Dave (musical), a 2018 stage musical adaptation of the film
 Dave (rapper), British rapper
 Dave (TV channel), a digital television channel in the United Kingdom and Ireland
 Dave (TV series), a 2020 American comedy series
 "Dave" (Lost), an episode of Lost

People
 Dave (given name), a list of people and fictional characters
 Dave (surname), a common Gujarati surname
 Dave (artist) (born 1969), Swiss artist
 Dave (rapper) (born 1998), English rapper from London
 Dave (singer) (born 1944), Dutch-born French singer

Software
 Dave (company), a digital banking service
 DAvE (Infineon), a C-language software development tool
 Thursby DAVE, a Windows file and printer sharing for Macs

Other uses
 Dave (Belgium), a town in Belgium
 DAVE (CP-7), a 1U CubeSat
 "Dave", a 1984 song by the Boomtown Rats from In the Long Grass 
 "Dave", a 2011 song by Missing Andy

See also
 Dave FM (disambiguation)
 
 Davey (disambiguation)
 David (disambiguation)
 Davy (disambiguation)